Oluklu is a village in the Kâhta District, Adıyaman Province, Turkey. The village is populated by Kurds of the Reşwan tribe and had a population of 754 in 2021.

The hamlets of Akçakent, Çakırlı, Doğantepe, Gözelek, Köprü, Köseler and Yeşilyurt are attached to Oluklu.

References

Villages in Kâhta District
Kurdish settlements in Adıyaman Province